This is the list of cathedrals in Liberia sorted by denomination.

Roman Catholic 
Cathedrals of the Roman Catholic Church in Liberia:
Cathedral of St. Therese of the Child Jesus in Cape Palmas
Cathedral of the Holy Spirit in Gbarnga
Sacred Heart Cathedral, Monrovia

Anglican
Cathedrals of the Church of the Province of West Africa:
Trinity Cathedral in Monrovia

See also
List of cathedrals

References

Churches in Liberia
Liberia
Cathedrals
Cathedrals